The 1985 UEFA European Under-16 Championship was the third edition of UEFA's European Under-16 Football Championship. Hungary hosted the championship, during 17–26 May 1985. 16 teams entered the competition, and the Soviet Union won its first title.

Qualifying

Participants

Results

First stage

Group A

Group B

Group C

Group D

Semi-finals

Third place match

Final

References
UEFA.com
RSSSF.com

 
1985
UEFA
Euro
1985
May 1985 sports events in Europe
1985 in youth association football